Coldharbour is a hamlet in the Mole Valley district, in the English county of Surrey. It is on a minor road from Dorking to Leith Hill Place.

Description
It has a church and a pub.

Notable residents
Virginia McKenna

References

External links

Exploring Surrey's past
Francis Frith
A Vision of Britain

Hamlets in Surrey